Jason Joseph Foley (born November 1, 1995) is an American professional baseball pitcher for the Detroit Tigers of Major League Baseball (MLB). He made his MLB debut in 2021.

Amateur career
Foley attended Mepham High School in his hometown of North Bellmore, New York, before attending Sacred Heart University for college. Foley went 10–14 over his Sacred Heart career, starting 37 of his 48 appearances over his three seasons, with a 4.84 career ERA and a K/9 ratio of 7.33. In 2016, he played collegiate summer baseball with the Chatham Anglers of the Cape Cod Baseball League. Foley left after his junior season and went undrafted in the MLB Draft before ultimately getting signed by the Tigers organization, who noticed him during his summer ball work in 2016.

Professional career
Foley threw in six games during the 2016 professional season, primarily at the short season single-A level with the Connecticut Tigers, but Foley turned heads in 2017 at the Class-A level with the West Michigan Whitecaps. Over 18 appearances and 29 innings, Foley logged a 1.55 ERA with five saves, 36 strikeouts to just five walks, and recorded a WHIP of 0.86, giving up just five earned runs during the duration of the season. He moved to the High-A Lakeland Flying Tigers at the end of the season, where he gave up five runs over 7.1 innings of work. Ahead of the 2018 season, however, Foley underwent Tommy John surgery and saw no professional action the full season.

Previously praised for his velocity by media outlets, hitting 101 MPH on his fastball, before his surgery, Foley lost velocity upon his return in 2019 with Lakeland, however he remained healthy for the full season. Foley finished 2019 with a 3–3 record and a 3.89 ERA over 36 appearances, all in relief. He averaged just under a strikeout per inning, and recorded a WHIP of 1.43. Foley saw no in-game professional action in 2020 due to the COVID-19 pandemic, however in 2021 he was added to the alternate-site Detroit Tigers roster in Toledo, where players both on the 40-man roster but inactive and off the roster (like Foley) played games to remain fit. In addition, with the first appearance of the season for Casey Mize and his subsequent graduation from the MLB.com Top 30 Prospects rankings for the Tigers, Foley entered the list at #30.

On June 6, 2021, the Tigers selected Foley's contract and promoted him to the major leagues for the first time. At the time of his promotion, Foley had a 3.60 ERA, 1.40 WHIP, and ten strikeouts in nine appearances (ten innings pitched) with the Toledo Mud Hens. He made his MLB debut that day, pitching a scoreless inning of relief against the Chicago White Sox.

References

External links

Sacred Heart Pioneers bio

1995 births
Living people
Baseball players from New York (state)
People from Manhasset, New York
Major League Baseball pitchers
Detroit Tigers players
Sacred Heart Pioneers baseball players
Chatham Anglers players
Gulf Coast Tigers players
Connecticut Tigers players
Lakeland Flying Tigers players
West Michigan Whitecaps players
Toledo Mud Hens players